The Women's 1 metre springboard competition of the diving events at the 2015 World Aquatics Championships was held on 26 and 28 July 2015.

Results
The preliminary round was held on 26 July at 15:00. The final was held on 28 July at 15:00.

Green denotes finalists

References

Women's 1 metre springboard